John Everard (20th February 1825 – 29 August 1886) was an Australian politician, serving in the Victorian Legislative Assembly. He was baptised on 7 April 1825 at Ratby, Leicestershire, England.

Everard was born at Groby, Leicestershire, the son of Thomas Everard, farmer, and his wife Mary, née Breedon.

Everard emigrated to Australia aboard the Adelaide, arriving in Melbourne on 11 May 1853 (James McCulloch, later Premier of Victoria, was a fellow passenger).

Everard served in the Victorian Legislative Assembly as Member for the electoral districts of Rodney from January 1858 to December 1859; North Gippsland in August 1861 (elected, but not sworn in as he had become insolvent) and again from April 1864 to August 1864; and Collingwood March 1868 to January 1871 and again May 1874 to July 1874 (resigned because he had become insolvent again).

Everard was a tea merchant and also a stock and share broker. He was Chairman of the National Eight Hours League and also Chairman of the Victorian Industries Protection League. Everard died on 29 August 1886 at South Yarra.

Everard was the father of William Everard who served as a Member and also Speaker of the Victorian Legislative Assembly.

References

1825 births
1886 deaths
Members of the Victorian Legislative Assembly
People from Groby
English emigrants to colonial Australia
19th-century Australian politicians
Politicians from Leicestershire
Businesspeople from Melbourne
Politicians from Melbourne